Bhindar Kalan is a village in Mandi Bahauddin District, in the Punjab province of Pakistan. The population is about 2000. The literacy rate is above 80%. The village is in a well-cultivated area. The main crops are wheat, rice, and sugar cane. Most people of the village are either farmers or government servants. The village has been continuously developing since the partition in 1947.

References

External links
Mandi Bahauddin home page

Villages in Mandi Bahauddin District
Villages in Phalia Tehsil